Elle Girl is a spin-off of Elle magazine. It is a fashion magazine targeted to the teenage market. The magazine was published by Hachette Filipacchi. The magazine features a model, actress, or singer. It started with the fall 2001 issue and ceased publication in 2006 with the June/July issue.

2006 
June/July: Adam Brody
May: Emma Roberts
April: Amanda Bynes
March: Nicole Richie
February: Tyra Banks and Nicole Linkletter

2005 
December/January 2006: Emma Watson
November: Alexis Bledel
October: Mischa Barton
September: Rachel Bilson
August: Hilary Duff
June/July: Amber Tamblyn
May/June: Devon Aoki
April: Christina Ricci
March: Lindsay Lohan
February: Rachel Bilson

2004 
December/January 2005: Gwen Stefani
October/November: Sarah Michelle Gellar
September: Drew Barrymore
August: Avril Lavigne
February/March: Christina Aguilera

2003 
November/December: Mischa Barton
September/October: Michelle Branch
April: Avril Lavigne
February/March: Eve

2002 
Holiday: Mandy Moore and Kelly Osbourne
Fall: Jennifer Lopez
Summer: Megan Ewing
Spring: Gwen Stefani

2001 
Fall: Julia Stiles

References 

Elle Girl